San Rafael del Norte is a municipality and a town in the Jinotega department.

Elevated at over 3,000 feet, it is the highest town in Nicaragua, which attracts tourists from many countries for hiking, swimming and vacations.

Description
San Rafael del Norte lies to the North of Jinotega, about a forty-minute bus ride along a road that is  paved. The Catholic Church in town is home to several murals illustrating the usual tenets of the Catholic faith. One, in particular is noteworthy. The mural showing the Temptation of Jesus in the desert has achieved a local notoriety because many observers have noted that the face of the devil strongly resembles that of current Nicaraguan President Daniel Ortega. As the mural was painted in the 1960s, this similarity is either prescient or coincidental.
The murals were painted by a Swiss Artist, who was invited by Brother Odorico D'Andrea. an Italian priest who came to San Rafael del North in 1953. He was responsible for building health centers, bridges, as well as projects which provided drinking water and electrification. After his death in 1990, his body was found to be corrupt, which is usually considered one of the signs of sainthood. His stone casket lies in Templo Tepayec, a monument at the end of the main street through town, with a very visible set of steps leading up to it.
The small town of San Rafael del Norte is famous for being the birthplace of Blanca Aráuz, Augusto C. Sandino's wife. This national hero, who fought against the American intervention on Nicaragua, fell in love with her in 1927 while she was a telegrapher in town. Blanca's family house is currently a museum with historical objects, such as newspaper articles, Sandino's letters and American weapons. This museum recently closed because the roof of the house caved in.
 
Another famous inhabitant of this town has Odorico D'Andrea. This Italian priest got here in 1954 and played an important role in the development of San Rafael del Norte. He help organizing health centers, providing clear water and electricity to people, among other things. D' Andrea, who died in 1990, was buried at the Virgen del Tepeyac church, which also offers nice views of the city.
 
This priest also gave an important impulse to the renovation of San Rafael del Norte's church, located in the center of the town. The building is notorious for its colorful stained glass and impressive size, which contrasts with the size of the town itself.
 
Furthermore, there is a private natural reserve in this municipality: El Jaguar, commonly known and visited for its many trails, which are suitable for birdwatching tours. It also has lodging options for tourists and a biological station for students and biologists. Another interesting site if the coffee farm called Kilimanjaro, where visitors learn about the coffee production, arrange a horseback ride, among other activities. It is possible to stay overnight at this farm.

Hotel
Hotel Casita San Payo (505) 2784 2327
Hotel Casa Real (505) 2784 2422

Transportation

Local bus 
Jinotega-Estelí-Yali Routes
Trans. San Jose
Trans. Zelaya
Trans. Gloria
Trans. El Jocotillo
Trans. Chepita
Trans. Jesus

Shuttle bus
San Rafael to Jinotega
Trans. Isabelia
Trans. Jaime

Express bus 
 Expreso Arauz
– San Rafael- Managua Dep: 4:00 A.M Arr: 7:30 A.M
– Managua- San Rafael Dep: 3:30 P.M Arr: 7:00 P.M

Radio stations and communications 
 Radio Isabelia 89.3 FM
 Enitel (phone and internet)

Quick stats
Department: Jinotega
Population 16,320 people
Surface 606.00 km²
Distance 185 km from Managua
Urban/rural 24% / 76%

Attractions
Canopy La Brellera
El Jaguar Private Natural Reserve
Tepeyac Retreat Center
Los Encuentros
Piscina Sabana Grande
Waterfalls
Laguna Verde
San Rafael Cathedral
Kilimanjaro Tourist Farm

References

External links
 Official website
 http://www.jinotegalife.com

Municipalities of the Jinotega Department